Overland Red is a 1920 American silent Western film directed by Lynn Reynolds and starring Harry Carey. It is not known whether the film currently survives.

Plot
As described in a film magazine, Overland Red (Carey), a "knight of the road," and his young pal Collie (Goodwin) find a prospector dead in the desert. On his body they discover papers giving the location of a gold mine. The sheriff of a western town and his accomplices are seeking the mine. Overland and Collie are arrested but the papers are not found on them. The sheriff plans on charging Overland with murder, hoping that he will then disclose the location of the mine. The two knights of the road escape, however, and are found on the Alacarme ranch by Louise (Vale), whom they had seen from the observation car of a train. Collie is in love with Louise and at her suggestion remains at the ranch. Overland is sought by the sheriff, but her evades him until one day Collie is shot by the sheriff's accomplices. A fight ensues and the sheriff is killed. Collie and Louise are happy in their love, and Overland departs, happy that he brought the two together.

Cast
 Harry Carey as Overland Red
 Charles Le Moyne as Silent Saunders
 Harold Goodwin as Collie
 Vola Vale as Louise Alacarme
 David B. Gally as Billy Winthrop
 C. E. Anderson as Boggs (as C. Anderson)
 Joe Harris as Sago
 J. Morris Foster

See also
 Harry Carey filmography

References

External links

 

1920 films
1920 Western (genre) films
American black-and-white films
Films directed by Lynn Reynolds
Silent American Western (genre) films
Universal Pictures films
1920s American films